The Alexander ALX400 (later known as the TransBus ALX400 and the Alexander Dennis ALX400) was a 2-axle double-decker bus body built by Walter Alexander Coachbuilders (later by TransBus International/Alexander Dennis). It was one of the ALX-series bodywork, all of which (except the ALX100) featured the same designs on the front and rear panels that were originally designed for the new generation of mainly low-floor bus chassis produced since the late 1990s.

Description
Various seating configurations were available, with Transport for London (TfL) specification models fitted with a central exit door. There are typically 45 seats on the upper deck, and between 17 (on the DAF DB250) and 22 seats on the lower deck. Longer models for use elsewhere have up to 47 seats on the upper deck, and 24 below with a central door. Stagecoach subsidiaries outside London have ALX400s on long-wheelbase Dennis Trident 2 chassis, fitted with 51 seats upstairs (47 on later models) and 28 downstairs. These buses have been used all over the UK, in major cities including London, Birmingham, Manchester and Newcastle.

History
First unveiled in 1997, the Alexander ALX400 replaced the step-entrance Alexander R-series and was fitted to numerous chassis, including the Dennis/TransBus Trident, the DAF/VDL DB250LF and the Volvo B7TL.

The Alexander ALX400 proved to be a major success with national operators; large numbers of the buses served London and the rest of the United Kingdom. From its introduction until 2006, the Alexander ALX400 on the Dennis Trident chassis was the favoured 2-axle double-decker bus model for the Stagecoach Group, with Stagecoach London in particular ordering 998 such ALX400s from 1998 to 2006, while Arriva London would also order 389 ALX400s on the DAF DB250 chassis between 1998 and 2005; Arriva's DLA1, the first-built ALX400 and London's first low-floor double decker delivered in 1998, was restored to as-new condition by Alexander Dennis from 2017 to 2019 and had been planned to be exhibited at the London Transport Museum, however it is now in the ownership of a group of enthusiasts in Kent.

The ALX400 was also popular with Dublin Bus of Ireland, which ordered 658 between 2000 and 2006. All but ten were fitted on Volvo B7TL chassis, with a batch of ten fitted on the TransBus Trident chassis delivered in 2003 to compare against the B7TLs with a view to splitting future orders. Most of these featured 76 seat single door bodies although there were various seating capacities for on a small minority used and rail/airport services. Summerhill based AV 116-130 were built with dual door bodies for use on the Airlink services.

Outside London, Arriva ordered ALX400s on both the Dennis Trident and Volvo B7TL chassis in comparatively smaller numbers compared to Stagecoach and the FirstGroup. On the Volvo B7TL chassis, 20 ALX400s were delivered to Arriva Yorkshire in 2000, 49 were delivered to Arriva Medway Towns in 2004 as part of Operation Overdrive, and 30 ALX400s were delivered to Arriva Merseyside in 2006, while on the Dennis Trident chassis, 30 ALX400s were delivered to Arriva Shires & Essex in 2000.

In late 2005 Alexander Dennis launched the Enviro400 model, intended as a replacement for the ALX400. Despite the bulk of the 2006 Stagecoach double-decker bus order favouring the Enviro400 model, also chosen by London operator Metroline, in July 2006 Dublin Bus placed a repeat order for 100 of the type on Volvo B7TL chassis. Production of the ALX400 bodywork ceased after the delivery of these 100 ALX400-bodied Volvo B7TL in late 2006.

Gallery

References

External links

Alexander Dennis buses
Double-decker buses
Low-floor buses
Vehicles introduced in 1997